Pseudotephritina is a genus of picture-winged flies in the family Ulidiidae. There are at least two described species in Pseudotephritina.

Species
Pseudotephritina cribellum (Loew, 1873)
Pseudotephritina inaequalis (Malloch, 1931)

References

Ulidiidae
Diptera of North America
Brachycera genera
Taxa named by John Russell Malloch